The Hong Kong Science Park (HKSTP) is a science park in Pak Shek Kok, New Territories, Hong Kong. It sits on the Tolo Harbour waterfront, near the Chinese University of Hong Kong. The park is administered by the Hong Kong Science and Technology Parks Corporation, a statutory body established in 2001. Reclamation for the Science Park site at the southern part of the area was completed in December 1999.

The campus is located mostly in Sha Tin District and partly in Tai Po District.

Facilities
Hong Kong Science Park provides a campus-like environment of 330,000 square metres marketed for high-technology enterprises. It is designed to accommodate companies of all sizes and stages of development and to promote interaction and innovation at both a local and global level.

Transport 
 Bus route: 43P, 43S, 74D, 74P, 82C, 263A, 271B, 272A, 272K, 272S, 274P
 Minibus route: 27, 27A, 27B
 University station (MTR)

See also 
 Cyberport
 Lok Ma Chau Loop Innovation and Technology Park

References

External links 

 

Science parks in China
Ma Liu Shui
Pak Shek Kok
Places in Hong Kong
Science and technology in Hong Kong